The Oregon State Beavers women's gymnastics team represents Oregon State University in NCAA women's artistic gymnastics, competing at the Gill Coliseum in Corvallis, Oregon.

History 
The program began in 1966; competing the first time in 1967, with Sylvia Moore taking the lead as the first gymnastics coach of the modern era of Oregon State. She headed the program until 1975, when Ron Ludwig succeeded her – the Beavers finished sixth at the AIAW Regional in Monmouth, Oregon. With Ludwig at the helm, the Beavers won the Regional Championship five times, not placing below fourth the whole ten years he was leading. In 1979, Oregon State finished seventh at the AIAW Championships. The next season the Beavers finished in a record fourth in the team competition, with two representatives in event finals. In 1981, Mary Ayotte finished in a record seventh place in the all-around at Nationals as the Beavers placed seventh but, the Beavers' first National champion was Laurie Carter, who won the balance beam. Mary Ayotte soon became Oregon State's second National champion when, in 1982, she was the National floor champion. 1983 saw the Beavers finish ninth at Nationals. Heidi Anderson, a transfer from Penn State, won the balance beam title in 1984. Oregon State were sixth in 1985. Ludwig resigned in June 1985, citing health problems.

Jim Turpin succeeded Ludwig, taking time for the program to adjust with no representation at the 1986 Nationals; the program did finish third at Regionals though. The program didn't advance to Nationals again in 1987, but were seventh in 1988, advancing following their Regional win at home in Corvallis. Joy Selig was fourteenth in the all-around and took a silver medal in the floor exercise. Selig proved to be a strong Beaver gymnast with a beam national title in 1989. 1990 was another great year for Selig as she defended her beam title, as well as gaining the floor title too. In 1991, the Beavers were fourth in the team competition and saw medals from Chari Knight and Joy Selig. Amy Durham tied with two gymnasts in 1993 for the National floor title. Turpin left the Beavers program following the 1997 season, and former UCLA standout Tanya Chaplin became his successor. In 2001, Katrina Severin was second on the vault. The Beavers won the 2008 West Regional, held in Corvallis. Mandi Rodriguez was third on vault at the 2010 Nationals. 2011 saw the Beavers win the NCAA Regional and Jen Kesler and Makayla Stambaugh make the uneven bars podium. In 2012, Melanie Jones took a bronze on floor. In 2014, Madeline Gardiner took a bronze medal in the beam. Junior Risa Perez who transferred from Arizona State in 2015 was top 3 at Pac-12 championships on Floor Routine, in 2016 Gardner along with now senior Risa Perez won the Pac-12 Beam Championships, Perez won the Regional Beam Georgia Championships finished 8th overall at Texas Nationals. Gardiner then repeated this the following year in 2015.

Current roster 
Below is a roster of gymnasts on the team for the 2021–2022 season.

Coaches over time

Past Olympians 
 Olivia Vivian  (2008)
 Madeline Gardiner  (2012 alternate)
 Jade Carey  (2020)

References

External links
 Legends of OSU Gymnastics Oral History Interviews

 
Sports in Corvallis, Oregon
Sports clubs established in 1967
1967 establishments in Oregon